Amazon Go is a chain of convenience stores in the United States and the United Kingdom, operated by the online retailer Amazon. The stores are cashierless, thus partially automated, with customers able to purchase products without being checked out by a cashier or using a self-checkout station. As of 2020, there are 29 open and announced store locations in Seattle, Chicago, San Francisco, London and New York City.

Amazon Go stores were conceptualized and tested by a team of Amazon executives, who constructed a 15,000-square-foot mock supermarket in a rented warehouse in Seattle, before revealing the work to Amazon founder Jeff Bezos in 2015. The first store, located in the company's Day 1 building, opened to employees on December 5, 2016, and to the public on January 22, 2018. The flagship store sells products such as prepared foods, meal kits, limited groceries and liquor. A larger variant, Amazon Go Grocery, opened in Seattle's Capitol Hill neighborhood on February 25, 2020. The following month Amazon began to offer its technology to other retailers so that their customers could make purchases without the involvement of cashiers or Amazon accounts.

Technology and implementation
Amazon uses several technologies to automate Go stores, including computer vision, deep learning algorithms, and sensor fusion for the purchase, checkout, and payment steps associated with a retail transaction. The store concept is seen as a revolutionary model that relies on the prevalence of smartphones and geofencing technology to streamline the customer experience, as well as supply chain and inventory management. However, public rollout of the Seattle Amazon Go prototype location was delayed due to issues with the sensors' ability to track multiple users or objects within the store, such as when children move items to other shelves or when multiple customers have a similar body habitus.

The Amazon Go app for iOS and Android links to their Amazon account and is the primary method of paying for items at the store, alongside cash at certain locations. The app is required to enter the store, which has turnstiles that scan a QR code generated on the app. The app allows users to add others to their Amazon account, so a family's purchases can be charged to the same bill. The ceiling of the store has multiple cameras and store shelves have weight sensors, to detect which item(s) a customer took. If a customer takes an item off the shelf, it will be added to the customer's virtual cart. Similarly, if a customer places an item back on the shelf, it is removed from the customer's virtual cart.

Locations
As of February 2023, there are 29 store locations (established) in the United States, and 15 in the United Kingdom.

Stores

In its report on the opening of the first location, The Wall Street Journal said that Amazon planned to open at least three stores, each with a different format. In October 2016, Business Insider reported that they had seen internal Amazon documents detailing plans to open as many as 2,000 stores over the next ten years. This was refuted by an Amazon spokesman, who insisted the company was still learning.

The Verge reported that the first store was scheduled to open to the public in early January 2017, preceded by a December 2016 beta version for Amazon employees only. At  it was only the size of a corner convenience store. By October 2017, the store had yet to open to the public due to issues with the technology tracking over 20 people at one time. The public opening finally took place on January 22, 2018.

In addition to stocking name brands and local brands, the store sells many of Amazon's house brands, such as Wickedly Prime and 365. A second Downtown Seattle location at the Madison Centre opened on August 27, 2018.

In May 2018, The Seattle Times reported that Amazon was planning to open Amazon Go stores in Chicago and San Francisco; and in September, it was confirmed that the company planned to open a store in New York City. In September 2018, Amazon Go opened its first location outside of Seattle at the company's offices in the Chicago Loop. That same month, Bloomberg News reported Amazon was considering plans to open as many as 3,000 Amazon Go locations across the United States by 2021. An Amazon Go location was opened in San Francisco on October 23, 2018, at 98 Post Street.

In response to potential discrimination against low-income people, San Francisco, Philadelphia, and New Jersey have passed legislation banning cashless stores and retailers. A new Amazon Go store in New York City opened on May 7, 2019, with cash acceptance in response to previous criticism over the use of app-only purchases and its effects on the poor. In response to the legislation, stores in San Francisco also accept cash, with an attendant at the front letting in and checking out customers if they do not have the app.

On February 25, 2020, Amazon opened the first Amazon Go Grocery store in Seattle's Capitol Hill neighborhood. A second Go Grocery location opened in September 2020 in the Overlake neighborhood of Redmond, Washington.

In 2023, Amazon announced it would close eight Amazon Go stores in Seattle, New York City and San Francisco.

See also

 Automated retail
 Cashierless store
 Cashless society
 Technological unemployment

References

External links

 Amazon Go

Retail companies established in 2018
2018 establishments in Washington (state)
Amazon (company)
Companies based in Seattle
Computer-related introductions in 2018
Convenience stores